Anthony Warde (born Benjamin Schwartz; January 1, 1909 – January 8, 1975) was a noted American actor who appeared in over 150 films between 1937 and 1964.

Early years
Born as Benjamin Schwartz in Philadelphia, Pennsylvania on New Year's Day 1909, Warde was raised in Danbury, Connecticut.

Stage
Warde gained early acting experience at the Pasadena Playhouse and performed with the Federal Theatre Project. In 1940, he toured with the Eighteen Actors dramatic group, which included Victor Jory and Morris Ankrum, among others. In 1953, he worked in summer stock theatre.

Film
Warde started his Hollywood career in Escape by Night, appearing in a handful of undistinguished feature films before gaining popularity as one of the hardest working henchmen in the 1930s and 1940s serials.

Warde first appeared in his first film bow in 1936, but he spent most of his time bothering serials heroes as a vicious bodyguard, underground leader or infamous rustler, but also was satisfactory in character roles and the occasional sympathetic part. Usually, he played in many unsavory characterizations, including low-budget crime and Western styles throughout his career. He also appeared in popular serials such as Flash Gordon's Trip to Mars (1938), for Universal; The Spider Returns (1941) and Batman (1943) for Columbia, as well as in The Masked Marvel (1943), The Purple Monster Strikes (1945) and The Black Widow (1947) for Republic.

But Warde is probably best remembered for playing Killer Kane, gangster ruler of the Earth in Universal's adaptation of Buck Rogers (1939). In the 1950s, he made a multiple number of TV appearances including a brief turn as a counterfeiter in two episodes of Amos 'N' Andy.

Warde made his last screen appearance in The Carpetbaggers, a 1964 film adaptation of Harold Robbins' best-seller novel. Following his acting career, he owned a men's clothing store.

Death
Warde died in Hollywood, California, at the age of 66.

Selected filmography

Films

 Escape by Night (1937) - Mike Grayson
 A Girl with Ideas (1937) - Gangster (uncredited)
 Tim Tyler's Luck (1937, Serial) - Garry Drake
 Hollywood Stadium Mystery (1938) - Krim in Play (uncredited)
 King of the Newsboys (1938) - Henchman (uncredited)
 Flash Gordon's Trip to Mars (1938, Serial) - King Turan of the Forest People [Chs. 7, 11, 13]
 Law of the Underworld (1938) - Larry (uncredited)
 The Saint in New York (1938) - Maury Yule (uncredited)
 Marie Antoinette (1938) - Marat (uncredited)
 The Crowd Roars (1938) - Cain's Third Bodyguard (uncredited)
 Come On, Leathernecks! (1938) - Nick
 The Affairs of Annabel (1938) - Bailey
 The Storm (1938) - Sailor (uncredited)
 Newsboys' Home (1938) - Blake (uncredited)
 Pacific Liner (1939) - Crew Member (uncredited)
 Risky Business (1939) - Jackson's Henchman (uncredited)
 Twelve Crowded Hours (1939) - Jerry Miller (uncredited)
 Almost a Gentleman (1939) - Kidnapper (uncredited)
 Buck Rogers (1939, Serial) - Killer Kane
 Tell No Tales (1939) - Frankie Lewis (uncredited)
 Mr. Moto Takes a Vacation (1939) - Joe Rubla
 Dust Be My Destiny (1939) - Second Thug on Train (uncredited)
 Oklahoma Frontier (1939) - Wayne
 The Amazing Mr. Williams (1939) - Bouncer (uncredited)
 Chip of the Flying U (1939) - Ed Duncan
 Charlie McCarthy, Detective (1939) - Photographer (uncredited)
 The Earl of Chicago (1940) - Kilmount Salesman (uncredited)
 Florian (1940) - Rider (uncredited)
 Millionaires in Prison (1940) - Max, Convict (uncredited)
 The Sea Hawk (1940) - Whipper (uncredited)
 So You Won't Talk (1940) - Dolf
 The Green Archer (1940, Serial) - Lefty Brent (uncredited)
 Ridin' on a Rainbow (1941) - Scoop Morrison, Bank Robber
 Lady from Louisiana (1941) - Lottery Thug (uncredited)
 The Spider Returns (1941, Serial) - Henchman Trigger
 Singapore Woman (1941) - Tough Seaman in Crow's Nest (uncredited)
 Down in San Diego (1941) - Tony
 Blues in the Night (1941) - Del's Henchman #1 (uncredited)
 Johnny Eager (1941) - Guard Outside Luce's Office Door (uncredited)
 Dick Tracy vs. Crime Inc. (1941) - John Corey
 The Man with Two Lives (1942) - Hugo
 Broadway (1942) - Gangster (uncredited)
 Timber (1942) - Henchman (uncredited)
 Eyes of the Underworld (1942) - Doorman (uncredited)
 King of the Mounties (1942, Serial) - Stark
 Pittsburgh (1942) - Kane's Fight Attendant (uncredited)
 Silent Witness (1943) - Racketeer Lou Manson
 Keep 'Em Slugging (1943) - Thug (uncredited)
 The Ghost and the Guest (1943) - Killer Blake
 Shantytown (1943) - Gangster (uncredited)
 White Savage (1943) - Clerk
 A Gentle Gangster (1943) - Charles
 I Escaped from the Gestapo (1943) - Lokin
 Three Hearts for Julia (1943) - Reporter at Army Concert Hall (uncredited)
 Captive Wild Woman (1943) - Tony - Handler (uncredited)
 Crime Doctor (1943) - First Reporter in Court (uncredited)
 Batman (1943, Serial) - Stone (uncredited)
 Secret Service in Darkest Africa (1943, Serial) - Relzah [Ch. 12-13] (uncredited)
 The Masked Marvel (1943, Serial) - 'Killer' Mace
 So's Your Uncle (1943) - Stagehand
 Where Are Your Children? (1943) - Jim Lawson
 Riders of the Deadline (1943) - 'Gunner' Madigan
 The Desert Song (1943) - French Soldier (uncredited)
 The Phantom (1943, Serial) - Karak (uncredited)
 The Impostor (1944) - Soldier (uncredited)
 The Great Alaskan Mystery (1944, Serial) - Brandon [Chs. 3-13]
 Follow the Boys (1944) - Captain (uncredited)
 The Chinese Cat (1944) - Catlen
 Waterfront (1944) - 2nd Waterfront Sailor (uncredited)
 Are These Our Parents? (1944) - Sam Bailey
 Sensations of 1945 (1944) - Moroni (uncredited)
 The Mummy's Ghost (1944) - Detective (uncredited)
 Dixie Jamboree (1944) - 'Double', Phony Indian
 Machine Gun Mama (1944) - Carlos
 Shadow of Suspicion (1944) - Bill Randall
 Mystery of the River Boat (1944, Serial) - Bruno Bloch
 Brenda Starr, Reporter (1945, Serial) - Muller [Ch 1-10] (uncredited)
 Here Come the Co-Eds (1945) - Carlton Basketball Coach (uncredited)
 There Goes Kelly (1945) - Bob Farrell
 The Cisco Kid Returns (1945) - Paul Conway
 The Monster and the Ape (1945, Serial) - Joe Flint- Henchman
 Bewitched (1945) - Masher on Street (uncredited)
 The Purple Monster Strikes (1945, Serial) - Tony [Ch. 7]
 Secrets of a Sorority Girl (1945) - Nick Vegas
 Paris Underground (1945) - Underground Leader (uncredited)
 Allotment Wives (1945) - Joe Agnew
 Captain Tugboat Annie (1945) - Jake
 Black Market Babies (1945) - Paul Carroll
 The Mask of Diijon (1946) - Hold-up Man (uncredited)
 Hop Harrigan (1946, Serial) - Edwards
 The Wife of Monte Cristo (1946) - Captain Benoit
 King of the Forest Rangers (1946, Serial) - Burt Spear
 Dark Alibi (1946) - Jimmy Slade
 The Mysterious Mr. M (1946, Serial) - Martin Brandon (uncredited)
 The Missing Lady (1946) - Henchman Lefty
 Wife Wanted (1946) - Friendship Club Con Artist (uncredited)
 Don Ricardo Returns (1946) - Don Jose Luerra
 The Thirteenth Hour (1947) - Ranford
 Bells of San Fernando (1947) - Juan Mendoza, Overseer
 Killer Dill (1947) - Louie Moronie
 High Tide (1947) - Nick Dyke
 That Hagen Girl (1947) - Eddie - Pushy Night Club Patron (uncredited)
 The Black Widow (1947, Serial) - Nick Ward
 King of the Bandits (1947) - Smoke Kirby
 Devil Ship (1947) - Burke
 Panhandle (1948) - Kenney (uncredited)
 Here Comes Trouble (1948) - Police Reporter (uncredited)
 Dangers of the Canadian Mounted (1948, Serial) - Mort Fowler
 The Dude Goes West (1948) - Barney - the Bartender (uncredited)
 Stage Struck (1948) - Mr. Barda
 The Big Punch (1948) - Con Festig
 Congo Bill (1948, Serial) - Rogan
 Fighting Fools (1949) - Marty, a Henchman (uncredited)
 Trail of the Yukon (1949) - Muskeg Joe
 Radar Patrol vs. Spy King (1949, Serial) - Ricco Morgan
 South Sea Sinner (1950) - First Policeman (uncredited)
 Storm Warning (1951) - Jukebox Collector (uncredited)
 The Lemon Drop Kid (1951) - Thoughtful Man (uncredited)
 Roaring City (1951) - Bill Rafferty
 Mysterious Island (1951, Serial) - Confederate Officer (uncredited)
 The Atomic City (1952) - Arnie Molter
 Hurricane Smith (1952) - Bos'n (uncredited)
 The Stars Are Singing (1953) - Bit Role (uncredited)
 The War of the Worlds (1953) - Military Police Driver (uncredited)
 The Girl Who Had Everything (1953) - Victor's Colleague (uncredited)
 Houdini (1953) - Master of Ceremonies (uncredited)
 Here Come the Girls (1953) - Moretti - Clown in Dressing Room (uncredited)
 Casanova's Big Night (1954) - Gondolier (uncredited)
 Rear Window (1954) - Detective (uncredited)
 Day of Triumph (1954) - Barabbas
 Strategic Air Command (1955) - Yakotda Controller (uncredited)
 The Man Who Knew Too Much (1956) - French Policeman (uncredited)
 The Delicate Delinquent (1957) - Police Academy Drill Instructor (uncredited)
 Inside the Mafia (1959) - Bob Kalen (uncredited)
 The Carpetbaggers (1964) - Moroni (final film role)

Television
 The Amos 'n Andy Show (1951-1953) - Joe / Frankie
 Sky King (1952) - Vic Lawrence
 The Abbott and Costello Show (1953) - Blackie
 The Loretta Young Show (1954)
 Topper (1955) - Barco
 The Adventures of Jim Bowie (1956) - Deshon
 The Life and Legend of Wyatt Earp (1960) - Curt Dance
 The Jack Benny Show (1961)
 Mister Ed (1961–63) - Sam Morgan / Policeman

References

External links

 
 
 Google Books

1909 births
1975 deaths
Male actors from Philadelphia
American male film actors
American male television actors
Male film serial actors
20th-century American male actors
American male stage actors
Marquette University alumni